Chad Patrick Kelly (born March 26, 1994) is an American professional gridiron football quarterback for the Toronto Argonauts of the Canadian Football League (CFL). He played college football at Clemson and Ole Miss. The Denver Broncos selected him in the seventh round with the final pick of the 2017 NFL Draft, making him that year's Mr. Irrelevant.

Early years
Kelly was born to Charlene Cudzylo and Kevin Kelly, a supermarket manager and younger brother of Pro Football Hall of Fame quarterback Jim Kelly. He spent his early years in Western New York, his mother's home area, not far from where his uncle Jim was playing professional football. Chad Kelly was a consistent strong performer in Punt, Pass, and Kick competitions as a youth, becoming national champion four times. His family moved to Red Lion, Pennsylvania, after Kevin was assigned to a Wegmans in the area, but unexplained disciplinary issues removed Chad from the Red Lion High School football team, and he returned to Western New York.

Regarding Chad's early football career, a football coach once said, "Being Jim Kelly's nephew has been harder for him than it has helped him. A lot is expected of him because he’s Jim's nephew. He was never just 'Chad' or even 'Kevin Kelly’s son.' He was always 'Jim Kelly’s nephew.'"

Jim Kelly said of his nephew, "Athletic ability, Chad has more than I had", with "a freaking rocket for an arm". Kelly attended St. Joseph's Collegiate Institute in Tonawanda, New York. He passed for 2,159 yards and 24 touchdowns and rushed for 1,059 yards and 15 touchdowns as a junior. He passed for 3,050 yards, 27 touchdowns and rushed for 991 yards with 14 touchdowns as a senior. He was rated by Rivals.com as a four-star recruit and was ranked among the top dual-threat quarterbacks in his class. Kelly committed to Clemson University to play college football.

College career

Clemson University
Kelly was redshirted his first year at Clemson in 2012. As a freshman in 2013, he appeared in five games, passing for 58 yards and rushing for 117 yards with a touchdown. In April 2014, Kelly was dismissed from Clemson's football team due to conduct detrimental to the team.

East Mississippi Community College
He transferred to East Mississippi Community College, where he spent one year. In his lone season with the Lions, he started 12 games and threw for 3,906 yards with 47 touchdowns and eight interceptions. He led East Mississippi to a 12–0 record and victory in the NJCAA National Football Championship.

Ole Miss
In December 2014, Kelly committed to the University of Mississippi under head coach Hugh Freeze. In his first year at Ole Miss, Kelly was named the starting quarterback.

Kelly played in his first game with Mississippi on September 5, 2015, against UT Martin and completed 9 for 15 pass attempts for 211 yards and two touchdowns while adding a 20-yard rushing touchdown. On September 19, 2015, he led Ole Miss to its second victory ever at Tuscaloosa. In the 43–37 victory over No. 2 Alabama, he completed 18 out of 33 passes for 341 passing yards and 3 passing touchdowns. On November 7, 2015, Kelly accounted for 478 total yards and six touchdowns against Arkansas. Although he completed 24-of-34 passes for 368 passing yards and three passing touchdowns, Mississippi lost to Arkansas, 52–53, in overtime. The following week, he threw two touchdown passes and rushed for two touchdowns in a 38–17 victory over No. 15 LSU. On January 1, 2016, he helped lead Ole Miss to a 48–20 victory over No. 16 Oklahoma State in the 2016 All-State Sugar Bowl. He won Sugar Bowl MVP Honors after accounting for 21 completions out of 33 passes for 302 passing yards, four touchdowns, and one interception. Kelly also led the team with 73 rushing yards on 10 carries. His 4 passing touchdowns tied a Sugar Bowl record and were most ever by a Rebels' quarterback in the Sugar Bowl.

Kelly finished his first season with Ole Miss with 298 of 458 (65.1%) completions for 31 touchdowns and 13 interceptions. He also accounted for 10 rushing touchdowns while appearing in all 13 games. While finishing the season with a 10–3 record, he became the first Ole Miss quarterback to lead the Rebels with victories over Alabama, Auburn, and LSU in the same season.

Kelly returned for his senior season in 2016. On November 5, 2016, Kelly suffered an injury during a 37–27 victory over Georgia Southern. The following day, it was reported that he would miss the rest of the season due to a torn ACL and a torn lateral meniscus. On February 16, 2017, the NFL rescinded an offer previously made to Kelly to participate in the NFL Scouting Combine.

Statistics

Professional career

Denver Broncos

Kelly was drafted by the Denver Broncos in the seventh round, 253rd overall, the last selection in the 2017 NFL Draft (Mr. Irrelevant). He was placed on the reserve/non-football injury list after having offseason wrist surgery.

Going into mini-camps for the 2018 season, he would compete with 2016 first-round draft pick Paxton Lynch for the backup quarterback role behind newly acquired Case Keenum. On August 13, 2018, Kelly was promoted to second-team to act as Case Keenum's backup. In Week 6 of the 2018 season, Kelly appeared in his first NFL game, kneeling for a one-yard loss at the end of the first half.

On October 24, 2018, the Broncos released Kelly following his arrest on suspicion of first-degree criminal trespassing. He allegedly entered a couple's place of residence after leaving teammate Von Miller’s Halloween party. On March 20, 2019, Kelly pleaded guilty to misdemeanor second-degree criminal trespassing for the incident.

Indianapolis Colts
On May 20, 2019, Kelly signed with the Indianapolis Colts. He was suspended the first two games of the 2019 season for violating the NFL's personal conduct policy. After being reinstated from suspension, he was waived on September 18, 2019. He was re-signed to the team's practice squad the next day. He was promoted to the active roster on November 9, 2019.

On September 5, 2020, Kelly was waived by the Colts and signed to the practice squad the next day. He was released on September 30.

Toronto Argonauts 
On February 11, 2022, Kelly signed with the Toronto Argonauts of the Canadian Football League (CFL). In the Argos first preseason game Kelly completed seven of 12 pass attempts for 78 yards. He completed eight of 15 pass attempts in his second preseason game, throwing for 85 yards with one touchdown and one interception. The Argos released Antonio Pipkin as part of the team's final roster cuts, which promoted Kelly to the role of backup quarterback to veteran McLeod Bethel-Thompson to begin the 2022 season. Kelly served as the backup quarterback for the entire season before being named the team's starting quarterback for the Argo's final match of the regular season. In the 109th Grey Cup, after Bethel-Thompson injured his throwing hand in the fourth quarter, Kelly came off the bench with the Argos trailing 23-17 and helped lead the them to a 24–23 win against the Winnipeg Blue Bombers. He completed four of six passes for 43 yards and rushed twice for 21 yards, including a 20-yard run to convert a second and 15 on the team's game-winning touchdown drive.

Career statistics

NFL career statistics

CFL career statistics

Personal life
Kelly's younger brother Casey also played quarterback for St. Joseph's and Mallard Creek High School. Casey currently attends Ole Miss and plays on the football team as a tight end.

In December 2014, Kelly was arrested following an altercation outside of a Buffalo, New York, nightclub in which he fought with bouncers and resisted arrest. Criminal charges were dropped in exchange for his plea of guilty to disorderly conduct, and he was ordered to complete fifty hours of community service.

References

External links

Toronto Argonauts bio
Ole Miss Rebels bio
Clemson Tigers bio

1994 births
Living people
Players of American football from Buffalo, New York
American football quarterbacks
Clemson Tigers football players
East Mississippi Lions football players
Ole Miss Rebels football players
Denver Broncos players
Indianapolis Colts players
St. Joseph's Collegiate Institute alumni
Toronto Argonauts players